Gazi Mazharul Anwar (22 February 1943 – 4 September 2022) was a Bangladeshi film director, producer, lyricist, screenwriter and music director. He earned the Bangladesh National Film Award for Best Lyricist a record seven times for the films Tit for Tat (1992), Ajante (1996), Churiwala (2001), Lal Dariya (2002), Kokhono Megh Kokhono Brishti (2003), Meyeti Ekhon Kothay Jabe (2016) and Joiboti Konyar Mon (2021). He worked as a lyricist in the "Swadhin Bangla Betar Kendra". He was awarded Ekushey Padak in 2002 and Independence Day Award in 2021 by the government of Bangladesh. He has penned lyrics for 267 films.

Career

1960s
Gazi started his career as a lyricist at Radio Pakistan. The Bangladeshi film industry was born in 1956. Gazi started his career as a lyricist in the Dhallywood film industry in 1965. He wrote songs for Zahir Raihan's films, including Kacher Dewal (1965), Behula (1966), and Dui Bhai (1968). In 1968, Zahir asked him to pen seven songs for a film in two days. Gazi amazed Zahir by finishing in two hours. During this time, Gazi wrote screenplays for multiple films, including Urdu songs for Urdu-language films.

1970s
In the 1970 film Jibon Theke Neya, Gazi wrote the songs. "E Khacha Bhangbo Ami", sung by Khan Ataur Rahman, became a hit. "Eki Sonar Aloy", sung by Sabina Yasmin, was another hit, whose popularity endures.

In 1971, the historic fight for Bangladesh's independence from Pakistan took place. Bangladeshi and Indian artists joined the movement through cultural protests. 'Swadhin Bangla Betar Kendra' was established for that purpose. Songs protesting Pakistani aggression and glorifying Bangladeshi freedom fighters' strength and contributions were penned by Anwar Parvez, Govind Haldar and Gazi Mazharul Anwar. He wrote the patriotic and popular songs "Ektara Tui Desher Kotha", and "Ekbar Jete Dena", first sung by Shahnaz Rahmatullah.

He wrote "Joy Bangla Banglar Joy", which became the theme song of Swadhin Bangla Betar Kendra. He also wrote "Amay Jodi Prosno Koro Kolokakolir Desh". "Joy Bangla" became the theme song for the Awami League. In 1972, he wrote the song "Shudhu Gaan Geye Porichoy" for the film Aponjon. In 1973, he wrote the popular "Monero Ronge Rangabo" for the film Masud Rana. In 1974, he wrote the hit song "Ganeri Khatay Sworolipi Likhe", sung by Runa Laila. It was her first Bangla song and established her as a household name. In 1974, he wrote songs for the patriotic film Alor Michil. Its songs, such as "Dukkho Korona" (sung by Abdul Jabbar) and "Ei Prithir Pore" (sung by Sabina Yasmin) remain popular. Other songs for Yasmin in the 1970s include "O Amar Rosiya Bondhure", "Ei Prithibir Pore", "Eki Sonar Aloy", "Monero Ronge Rangabo" and "Osru Diye Lekha".

1980s
In 1982, he wrote lyrics for Rajnigandha, Ronger Manush, Bhat De and Desh Pardesh. For Rajnigandha, he wrote "Ami Rajanigandha Phuler Moto" (sung by Yasmin), a major hit. He wrote "Jeona Saathi" (sung by Yasmin) for Door Desh. The latter fetched a National Film Award for Andrew Kishore. Gazi's "Sobai To Bhalobasa Chai" (sung by Andrew Kishore) was a big hit. "Dhonyo Hoyechi Ami", "Koto Sadhonay Emon Bhagyo Mele", and "E Jibone Tumi Ogo Ele", all sung by Yasmin, were successful. In 1984, he wrote popular songs for Mahanayak. In 1986, he wrote "Ei Duniya Ekhon To Aar" (sung by Mitali Mukherjee) for Dui Poisar Alta, starring Shabana. Mukherjee earned a National Film Award for that song. He wrote the song "Akasher Hate Achhe Ekrash Nil", which made Shammi Aktar popular.

1990s
In 1990, he directed the film Swadhin, based on a story from the liberation. In 1997, he wrote "Je Prem Swargo Theke" and "Tumi Amar Praner Cheye Priyo" for Praner Cheye Priyo. In 1999, he penned the songs for the film Biyer Phul, Ammajan, Madam Fuli, Ragi. Biyer Phul had the hit song "Tomay Dekhle Mone Hoy", sung by Kishore and Kanakchapa.

2000-present
In 2002, he wrote songs for Premer Taj Mahal. The soundtrack album was quite successful. It contained the hit "Chhotto Ekta Jibon Niye". He received his fourth National Film Award for Best Lyricist for the film. In 2003, he wrote "Kichu Kichu Manusher Jibone" for Phul Nebo Na Osru Nebo. It was sung by Kishore and Kanak Chapa. In 2005, his song "Sukher Pakhi Re", which appeared in the film Dui Noyoner Alo, earned Yasmin a National Film Award for Best Female Playback Singer.

Collaborations
He worked with almost every singer and music director of Dhallywood. Shahnaz Rahmatullah; He wrote songs for Shahnaz Rahmatullah, Syed Abdul Hadi, Sabina Yasmin and Runa laila. "Tondraha Noyono Amar", "Ektara Tui Desher Kotha", "Ekbar Jete Dena", "Ek Nodi Rokto Periye", "Sagorer Teer Theke", "Akasher hate ache ekrash nil" and "Chokher nozor emni koira ekdin khoiya jabe". He is best remembered for his collaborations with Yasmin. Her major hits came from her and included "Prem jeno mor godhuli belar Pantho pakhir kakoli", "Osru Diye Lekha", "Swojon Harano Diner", "Koto Sadhonay", "Jibon Amar Dhonyo Holo", "Ei Prithibir Pore", "O Amar Rosiya Bondhure", "Ei Mon Tomake Dilam", "Ami Rajanigandha Phuler Moto", "Tumi Je Amar Kobita", "Mohakal Seto Okul", "E Jibone Tumi Ogo Ele" and "Jeona Saathi". Other important collaborators included Runa Laila, Andrew Kishore, Kanak Chapa, Syed Abdul Hadi, Subir Nandi and Khurshid Alam.

His songs for Kishore included: "Ami Ekdin Tomay Na Dekhile", "Hayre Manush Rangin Phanush" and "Sobaito Bhalobasa Chai".  He wrote most of Syed Abdul Hadi's. Gazi wrote "Chhotto Ekta Jibon Niye", "Akashe Chand Utheche", "Onek Sadhonar Pore", "Je Prem Swargo Theke", "Ki Chhile Amar" and other tracks for Kanak Chapa.

Songs
A partial list of Anwar's compositions include:

Significant works

Lyricist

Director
He has directed 19 films. His filmography as a director follows:

Producer
Gazi has produced 23 films.

Legacy
Gazi Mazharul Anwar was unsurpassed as a Bangladeshi lyricist. He worked with music directors including Alam Khan, Sheikh Sadi Khan, Alauddin Ali, Samar Das, Satya Saha, Ahmed Imtiaz Bulbul and a later generation including Shawkat Ali Emon, Emon Saha and Ali Akram Shuvo.

He was among the lyricists of Swadhin Bangla Betar Kendra in 1971 alongside Apel Mahmud, Govind Haldar, Abdul Gaffar Chowdhury. He wrote the songs "Swajan Harano Diner Smarane", "Ektara Tui Desher Kotha", "Ek Nodi Rokto Periye" etc. These songs inspired the nation during the war. His songs elevated Sabina Yasmin, Runa Laila, Shahnaz Rahmatullah, Subir Nandi, Syed Abdul Hadi, Mahmudunnabi, Kanak Chapa, Andrew Kishore, Khalid Hasan Milu, Baby Nazneen and Monir Khan.

Awards
 Bangladesh National Film Award for Best Lyrics (1992, 1996, 2001, 2002, 2003 and 2016)
 Ekushey Padak (2002)
 Independence Award (2021)
 President's gold medal for his contribution in the liberation war, by Sheikh Mujibur Rahman
 Zia Gold Medal (2002)
 Desh Netri Sansrkitik Padak for his contribution in culture. 
 Dev Bhattacharya and SM Sultan Memorial Award in 1994. 
 Comilla-Chandpur Brahmanbaria Award in 1995. 
 SI DAB Award
 Dhaka Performing Arts Award
 Nattyashaba Award
 Purbani Chalaschitra Pathak Award
 Chitrali Pathak Award
 Comilla Foundation Award
 Jahir Raihan Chalaschitra Award
 Sequence Award
 Dhaka Bishwabiddalaya Shikkhai Alo Award
 Raza Hossain Khan Smriti Award
 Bangladesh Socio Cultural Center Award, and the Film Audience Award.

Lifetime achievement 
Anwar received several lifetime achievement awards including Cine Film Journalist Association Lifetime Achievement Award and CJFB Lifetime Achievement Award.

Death 
Gazi Mazharul Anwar died on the way to the United Hospital Limited at 7:55 am (UTC+6) on September 4, 2022.

References

External links
 

1943 births
2022 deaths
Bangladeshi lyricists
Bangladeshi music directors
Bangladeshi film directors
Best Lyricist National Film Award (Bangladesh) winners
Recipients of the Ekushey Padak in arts
Recipients of the Independence Day Award
People from Comilla District